Tarik Lucas Oliveira Novais (born 22 October 2002), commonly known as Tarik, is a Brazilian footballer who plays as a forward.

Career statistics

Club

Notes

References

2002 births
Living people
Brazilian footballers
Brazilian expatriate footballers
Association football forwards
Club Athletico Paranaense players
Comercial Futebol Clube (Ribeirão Preto) players
Al-Nasr SC (Dubai) players
Al Dhaid SC players
UAE Pro League players
UAE First Division League players
Expatriate footballers in the United Arab Emirates
Brazilian expatriate sportspeople in the United Arab Emirates